Linogeraeus is a genus of flower weevils in the family of beetles known as Curculionidae. There are at least 60 described species in Linogeraeus.

Species
These 66 species belong to the genus Linogeraeus:

 Linogeraeus aequalis Kuschel, 1983 c
 Linogeraeus ancilla Kuschel, 1983 c
 Linogeraeus appalachensis Prena, 2009 c
 Linogeraeus bosqi Kuschel, 1983 c
 Linogeraeus brevicollis Kuschel, 1983 c
 Linogeraeus bucolicus Kuschel, 1983 c
 Linogeraeus capillatus (Le Conte, 1876) c b
 Linogeraeus clarescens Kuschel, 1983 c
 Linogeraeus clientulus Kuschel, 1983 c
 Linogeraeus convexus Kuschel, 1983 c
 Linogeraeus crucifer Prena, 2009 c
 Linogeraeus devinctus Kuschel, 1983 c
 Linogeraeus expansus Kuschel, 1983 c
 Linogeraeus fausti Kuschel, 1983 c
 Linogeraeus finitimus c b
 Linogeraeus furtivus Kuschel, 1983 c
 Linogeraeus geayi Kuschel, 1983 c
 Linogeraeus grisescens Kuschel, 1983 c
 Linogeraeus hilaris Kuschel, 1983 c
 Linogeraeus hospes Kuschel, 1983 c
 Linogeraeus intritus Kuschel, 1983 c
 Linogeraeus laevicollis Kuschel, 1983 c
 Linogeraeus laevirostris c b
 Linogeraeus laticollis Kuschel, 1983 c
 Linogeraeus lentiginosus Kuschel, 1983 c
 Linogeraeus lineellus Casey, 1920 c
 Linogeraeus merens Casey, 1920 c
 Linogeraeus meritus Kuschel, 1983 c
 Linogeraeus nactus Kuschel, 1983 c
 Linogeraeus neglectus c b
 Linogeraeus nemorosus Kuschel, 1983 c
 Linogeraeus nubecula Kuschel, 1983 c
 Linogeraeus obnixus Kuschel, 1983 c
 Linogeraeus obscurus Kuschel, 1983 c
 Linogeraeus ohausi Kuschel, 1983 c
 Linogeraeus opicus Kuschel, 1983 c
 Linogeraeus parabilis Kuschel, 1983 c
 Linogeraeus pernotus Kuschel, 1983 c
 Linogeraeus perscitus (Herbst & J.F.W., 1797) c g b
 Linogeraeus pictulus Kuschel, 1983 c
 Linogeraeus picturatus Kuschel, 1983 c
 Linogeraeus pictus Kuschel, 1983 c
 Linogeraeus polylineatus Kuschel, 1983 c
 Linogeraeus postmaculatus Kuschel, 1983 c
 Linogeraeus praevaricatus Kuschel, 1983 c
 Linogeraeus propinquus Kuschel, 1983 c
 Linogeraeus proximus Kuschel, 1983 c
 Linogeraeus quadrivittatus Kuschel, 1983 c
 Linogeraeus repens Kuschel, 1983 c
 Linogeraeus rivularis Kuschel, 1983 c
 Linogeraeus seductus Kuschel, 1983 c
 Linogeraeus segregans Kuschel, 1983 c
 Linogeraeus similis Kuschel, 1983 c
 Linogeraeus simiolus Kuschel, 1983 c
 Linogeraeus spiniger Kuschel, 1983 c
 Linogeraeus squamirostris Prena, 2009 c
 Linogeraeus tenuiculus Kuschel, 1983 c
 Linogeraeus testatus Kuschel, 1983 c
 Linogeraeus tetrastigma Champion, G.C., 1908 c
 Linogeraeus tonsilis c b
 Linogeraeus tonsus Prena, 2009 c
 Linogeraeus trivittatus Casey, T.L., 1920 c
 Linogeraeus venezolanus Kuschel, 1983 c
 Linogeraeus vernalis Kuschel, 1983 c
 Linogeraeus vianai Kuschel, 1983 c
 Linogeraeus x-albus Kuschel, 1983 c

Data sources: i = ITIS, c = Catalogue of Life, g = GBIF, b = Bugguide.net

References

Further reading

External links

 

Baridinae